Bruce's Walk is a bush track in the Blue Mountains area of New South Wales, Australia. It is located approximately 100 kilometres west of Sydney, the capital of New South Wales.

Description and history

Bruce's Walk originally began as a maintenance track in 1931. The Railway Department had agreed to supply electricity to the Blue Mountains Shire Council from the power station at Lithgow and a transmission line was put through from Blackheath to Lawson, with a track to provide maintenance access. The line went south from Blackheath, passed a little west of the Grand Canyon, through the bush east of Medlow Bath, across the ridges north of Katoomba, Leura and Wentworth Falls, across the gullies on the fringes of Bullaburra and into Lawson. The authorities then decided to promote the maintenance track as a walking trail, which was duly opened on 21 November 1931. The surveyor who planned the track was A.Bruce, as a result of which the track eventually became known as Bruce's Walk.

A pamphlet was published to publicise the walk, which passed through a variety of scenery, including glens and ridges. However, from World War II onwards, the track was forgotten and neglected. Parts of the track were also blocked off when the council constructed Lake Greaves in 1942 as a local water supply. Much later, however, a local walker named Dick Rushton found a copy of the pamphlet published in 1931 and set out to clear and mark the track. In 1980 he led a party of walkers along the section of track between Bullaburra and Wentworth Falls, and in 1983 he created a written guide to the track.

By 1986, Bruce's Walk had come to the attention of two other walkers, Jim Smith and Wilf Hilder, who organised a group of volunteers to clear the track between Bullaburra and Wentworth Falls. In the process, they found many artefacts and features, including signs, shelter caves, seats and picnic tables.  This part of the track was officially opened on 24 May 1986, by Alderman David Lawton. The opening was attended by 118 people, including Dick Rushton, who was by then eighty years old.
(This opening was condemned by the National Parks and Wildlife Service and the Mayor of the Blue Mountains City Council.) Other stretches of the track, from Wentworth Falls to Medlow Bath, were also cleared by the volunteers and opened later in 1986. The track, however, is still patchy and largely without signposts, and is not shown on the topographic map for the area.

See also

 List of Blue Mountains articles

References